SCKBSTD is a musical with music and lyrics by Bruce Hornsby, Chip deMatteo and a book by Clay McLeod Chapman, produced in 2011.  
The story is about what happens to a family when a mysterious stranger arrives in a small town bringing fear and paranoia in his wake.

Background 
A stranger comes to a small town with a terrible secret. His presence has unintended consequences for a doctor (Marcus Lovett) and his wife (Jill Paice). Fear and paranoia grow when a child goes missing. In the end an unbearable loss brings a family and a town back together.

The musical's quirky title spelling is a variation on "sick bastard." The show's logo is a vanity license plate.

SCKBSTD includes 19 original songs by three-time Grammy Award winner (and 13-time nominee) Bruce Hornsby, who has sold 11 million records. Songs from SCKBSTD were featured on Hornsby's 2009 CD Levitate.

Productions

Virginia Stage Company (2011)
The world premiere of SCKBSTD took place at the Wells Theatre in Norfolk, VA on January 21, 2011 and ran until February 6, 2011. It was produced by Virginia Stage Company (Chris Hanna, artistic director; Keith Stava, managing director), in association with co-producers David Riemer & Mike Rafael for Spiral Staircase LLC, as part of VSC's "American Soil" series.

Creative team
The creative team for the VSC production includes John Rando (a Tony Award winner for directing Urinetown), Kimberly Grigsby (musical supervisor of Spider-Man: Turn Off the Dark, Spring Awakening), Jodie Moore (musical director), Jerome Robbins' Broadway Tony winner Scott Wise (choreographer), Robert Wierzel (lighting designer), Narelle Sissons (set designer), Darrel Maloney (projection design), Jennifer Caprio (costume design) and Jessica Paz (sound design).

Musical numbers

 "The Low Country"
 "Big Fish"
 "Holy Trinity"
 "Who Takes Care of Mom?"
 "Black Rats of London"
 "Simple Prayer"
 "The Don of Dons"
 "Where's the Bat?"
 "Invisible"
 "Continents Drift"
 "Paperboy"
 "If the World Only Knew"
 "Neighborhood Watch"
 "Michael/Raphael"
 "Simple Prayer" reprise
 "Soon Enough"
 "Here We Are Again"
 "Quasar"

One track, "Face to Face", was cut from the final play.

Characters

References

External links 
 
 Official Bruce Hornsby website
 Virginia Stage Company
 SCKBSTD blog

2011 musicals
Original musicals